William Elmes  (active 1811–20 ), was an English caricaturist.

There are over 45 caricatures by him, many on naval subjects, as well as two satires on slavery, in the Catalogue of Political and Personal Satires Preserved in the Department of Prints and Drawings in the British Museum., which describes his work as "genuine caricature, broadly burlesqued, naively drawn". His work includes caricatures after prints by James Gillray and  Thomas Rowlandson.

References

External links
 William Elmes (British Museum Bio)

English caricaturists
British draughtsmen
English illustrators
English cartoonists
English engravers
Artists from London
Year of birth missing
Year of death missing